Mary Louvestre (or Touvestre) was an African-American Union spy in Norfolk, Virginia during the United States Civil War. Mary delivered details of plans for the conversion of the wrecked  to an ironclad that would be named the CSS Virginia and which represented a great advance in Confederate naval capabilities.

Biography 

There are multiple accounts about her story. One account stems in part from documentation by then Secretary of the Navy, Gideon Welles. This account states that Louveste worked with another Union spy, William H. Lyons, who was one of the few workers at Norfolk's Gosport Navy Yard who did not flee when Norfolk was captured by the Confederate Army early in the war, but who was still providing information about the Confederacy through contacts at Fort Monroe. Welles states that Louveste came to him in great secrecy in February 1862 with documents about the CSS Virginia from Lyons.

Another account exists based on the work by novelist G. Allen Foster published in Ebony magazine in 1964 and on a history by Benjamin Quarles written in 1953, aspects of which have been repeated in many other sources, including a 1998 publication by the US Army Corps of Engineers. This account contains much more detail about Louvestre. In this account, Mary Louvestre was born in the Shenandoah Valley and was bought in her early teens by a small farmer. At the time of the Civil War she may have been between 55 and 70 years old. She had a talent for drafting, and to capitalize on her skills was taught to sew and trained as a seamstress. When the farm faced two tough years in a row, they were forced to sell Mary, who was bought by her owner's cousin, Simeon or John Louvestre, in Norfolk.

In July 1861, she overheard her employer (she bought her freedom with her money from seamstress skills), who worked as engineer or ship-chandler in Norfolk's Gosport Navy Yard bragging about the ironclad Merrimack (later renamed the CSS Virginia) they were building which would dominate the Union Navy. Early in the mornings for the next week, Mary snuck in to the engineers’ office and used her seamstress skills to trace the drawings of the ironclad.

In order to get her information to Union leaders, she obtained permission to visit her previous owners in the valley. Pass in hand, she headed for Union lines near Fredericksburg and with the assistance of the underground railroad, reached her destination. She was then escorted to Washington, D.C. under military guard, where she met with Secretary of the Navy Gideon Welles. Welles offered Mary freedom and employment, but Mary preferred to return and await freedom in Norfolk. The Union used the information to hasten the completion of the ironclad , which would later battle the Merrimac and protect Union blockaders from the Merrimac'''s offensive power.

Another contemporary account of her story, The Treason of Mary Louvestre'' by My Haley, was published in 2013 and is closer to the Foster version of the story.

Personal life 
Louvestre was married to Michael Louvestre and was known to be a Catholic.

References 

African Americans in the American Civil War
Women in the American Civil War
American spies
Female wartime spies
People from Norfolk, Virginia
People from the Shenandoah Valley
Year of death unknown
Year of birth uncertain
African-American Catholics